The men's individual skating was an event held as part of the figure skating at the 1920 Summer Olympics. It was the second appearance of the event and the sport, which had previously been held in 1908.

Nine skaters from six nations competed. Gillis Grafström of Sweden captured the first of three consecutive Olympic gold medals in the men's single event in 1920. 1908 gold medalist Ulrich Salchow finished fourth. At age 44, bronze medalist Martin Stixrud is the oldest man to ever win an Olympic medal in an individual winter event.

Results

Referee:
  Victor Lundquist

Judges:
  August Anderberg
  Louis Magnus
  Max Orban
  Knut Ørn Meinich
  Herbert Yglesias
  Edourd Delpy
  Walter Jakobsson

References

Sources
 
 

Figure skating at the 1920 Summer Olympics
1920 in figure skating
Men's events at the 1920 Summer Olympics